Calligonum polygonoides, locally known as  phog, is a small shrub found in Thar desert areas, usually 4 feet to 6 feet high but occasionally may reach even 10 feet in height with a girth of 1 to 2 ft. This plant is referred to as orta in old Arabic poetry. It commonly grows on dry sandy soils and on sand dunes. It is very hardy and being capable of growing under adverse conditions of soil and moisture. It is frost hardy. It produces root suckers and is easily propagated by cutting and layering.

Uses
Its charcoal is used to melt iron. Its flowers, known as phogalo in Rajasthani, are used to prepare raita.

The plant is fed to cattle. It is an important part of the habitat for semi-desert wildlife.

References

Further reading 
Kaul, R. N. (1963). Need for afforestation in the arid zones of India. La-Yaaran vol 13.
Ghosh, R. C. (1977). Hand Book on Afforestation Techniques. Dehradun.
Gupta, R. K. & I. Prakasah. (1975). Environmental Analysis of the Thar Desert. Dehradun.
Tadevosyan, T. L. (2001). On the ecology of the joint weed-like calligonum (Calligonum polygonoides L., Dicotyledones, Polygonaceae). Proceedings of Republican Youth Scientific Conference: The Future of Ecological Science in Armenia. Yerevan. pp. 35-42. (In Russian)
Tadevosyan, T. L. (2007). The role of vegetation in microhabitat selection of syntopic lizards, Phrynocephalus persicus, Eremias pleskei and Eremias strauchi from Armenia. Amphibia-Reptilia'' 28(3) 444-48.

polygonoides
Flora of Pakistan
Flora of Armenia
Flora of Azerbaijan
Flora of Rajasthan
Flora of the Thar Desert
Plants described in 1753
Taxa named by Carl Linnaeus